The Cypress Creek National Wildlife Refuge is located in the Cache River watershed in southernmost Illinois, largely in Pulaski County, but with extensions into Union, Alexander, and Johnson counties. The refuge was established in 1990 under the authority of the Emergency Wetlands Resources Act of 1986.

Features

The Refuge's area covers a variety of habitats, including cypress-tupelo swamp, bottomland forest, upland hardwood forests, oak barrens, and prairie grassland. Over 50 threatened and endangered species are found within the refuge's boundaries. In addition, several pre-Mississippian archaeological sites can be found in the refuge. Cypress Creek is a popular area for both waterfowl and upland game hunters. Hunting of geese, ducks, whitetail deer, rabbits, squirrels, quail and doves is permitted on most parts of the refuge. Fishing on the Cache is generally mediocre; game fish habitat has been significantly degraded by siltation, invasive species (most notably Asian carp), and changes to the natural hydrograph.

Management
Although administered by the United States Fish and Wildlife Service, the Refuge is part of the Cache River Wetlands Joint Venture Partnership, a confederation of state and federal agencies, non-profit groups, and private landowners with the common goal of preservation and restoration of the Cache River.

References

External links
Cypress Creek National Wildlife Refuge
GORP page on Cypress Creek NWR

Protected areas of Alexander County, Illinois
Protected areas of Johnson County, Illinois
National Wildlife Refuges in Illinois
Protected areas of Pulaski County, Illinois
Protected areas of Union County, Illinois
Wetlands of Illinois
Archaeological sites in Illinois
Protected areas established in 1990
1990 establishments in Illinois
Landforms of Alexander County, Illinois
Landforms of Johnson County, Illinois
Landforms of Pulaski County, Illinois
Landforms of Union County, Illinois
Ramsar sites in the United States